The 2009 Supercupa României was the 11th edition of Romania's season opener cup competition. The match was played in Bucharest at Stadionul Giuleşti-Valentin Stănescu on 26 July 2009, and was contested between Liga I title holders, FC Unirea Urziceni and Cupa României champions, CFR Cluj. The winner, after penalties, was CFR Cluj. CFR was the first club not from Bucharest to claim the trophy since its establishment in 1994. The trophy was handed to the winners by Romania national football team coach, Răzvan Lucescu.

Match

Details

References

External links
Romania - List of Super Cup Finals, RSSSF.com

Super
2009
CFR Cluj matches
Association football penalty shoot-outs